Berlingot and Company (French: Berlingot et compagnie) is a 1939 French comedy film directed by Fernand Rivers and starring Fernandel, Suzy Prim and Fernand Charpin.

It was shot at Marcel Pagnol's Marseille Studios. The film's sets were designed by the art director René Renoux.

Cast
 Fernandel as François, vendeur de berlingots
 Fernand Charpin as Victor, l'associé de François
 Suzy Prim as Isabelle Granville
 Fréhel  as Bohémia
 Jean Brochard as Le directeur de l'asile
 Rivers Cadet as Le lutteur
 Monique Bert as Thérèse
 Édouard Delmont as Courtepatte
 Jean Témerson as Un client du café
 Josselyne Lane as Lisa
 René Alié as Dédé
 Marco Behar as Le fou
 Jacques Servière as Gaston
 Fernand Flament as Paulo
 Le petit Jacky as La petite Gisèle
 Marcel Maupi as Isidore
 Marguerite Chabert

References

Bibliography 
 Crisp, C.G. Genre, Myth, and Convention in the French Cinema, 1929-1939. Indiana University Press, 2002.

External links

1939 films
French comedy films
1930s French-language films
Films directed by Fernand Rivers
1939 comedy films
Marseille Studios films
French black-and-white films
1930s French films